The 2019–20 I liga (currently named Fortuna I liga due to sponsorship reasons) was the 72nd season of the second tier domestic division in the Polish football league system since its establishment in 1949 and the 12th season of the Polish I liga under its current title. The league was operated by the PZPN. The league was contested by 18 teams. The regular season was played in a round-robin tournament. The season started on 26 July 2019 and concluded on 26 July 2020 (regular season). On 13 March 2020, the PZPN suspended the league due to the outbreak of COVID-19 pandemic. After consultation with the Polish government, the league resumed behind closed doors without any spectators on 2 June 2020.

Changes from last season
The following teams have changed division since the 2018–19 season.

To I liga
Relegated from 2018–19 Ekstraklasa
 Miedź Legnica
 Zagłębie Sosnowiec
Promoted from 2018–19 II liga
 Radomiak Radom
 Olimpia Grudziądz
 GKS Bełchatów

From I liga
Promoted to 2019–20 Ekstraklasa
 Raków Częstochowa
 ŁKS Łódź
Relegated to 2019–20 II liga
 Bytovia Bytów
 GKS Katowice
 Garbarnia Kraków

Team overview

Stadiums and locations

Effects of the COVID-19 pandemic

League table

Positions by round

Results

Results by round

Promotion play-offs
I liga play-offs for the 2019–20 season will be played in July 2020. The teams who finished in 3rd, 4th, 5th and 6th place are set to compete. I liga play-offs will be held for the first time in this format. The fixtures are determined by final league position – 3rd team of regular season vs 6th team of regular season and 4th team of regular season vs 5th team of regular season. The winner of final match will be promoted to Ekstraklasa for next season. All matches will be played in a stadiums of team which occupied higher position in regular season.

Top goalscorers

Attendances

See also
 2019–20 Ekstraklasa
 2019–20 II liga
 2019–20 III liga
 2019–20 Polish Cup

Notes

References

External link
 

I liga seasons
2019–20 in Polish football
Poland
I liga